The GRAM domain  is found in glucosyltransferases, myotubularins and other membrane-associated proteins. The structure of the GRAM domain is similar to that found in PH domains.

Proteins containing GRAM domains are found in all eukaryotes and bacteria, but not archaea.  Various GRAM domains can bind proteins or lipids.

Human proteins containing this domain
GRAMD1A; GRAMD1B; GRAMD1C; GRAMD2A; GRAMD2B; GRAMD4; MTM1; MTMR1; MTMR2; NCOA7; NSMAF; OXR1; SBF1; SBF2; TBC1D8; TBC1D8B; TBC1D9; TBC1D9B; WBP2; WBP2NL; dJ439F8.1;

References

Protein domains
Protein families
Peripheral membrane proteins